In enzymology, a Methanosarcina-phenazine hydrogenase is an enzyme that catalyzes the chemical reaction

H2 + 2-(2,3-dihydropentaprenyloxy)phenazine  2-dihydropentaprenyloxyphenazine

Thus, the two substrates of this enzyme are H2 and 2-(2,3-dihydropentaprenyloxy)phenazine, whereas its product is 2-dihydropentaprenyloxyphenazine.

This enzyme belongs to the family of oxidoreductases, specifically those acting on hydrogen as donor with other, known, acceptors.  The systematic name of this enzyme class is hydrogen:2-(2,3-dihydropentaprenyloxy)phenazine oxidoreductase. Other names in common use include methanophenazine hydrogenase, and methylviologen-reducing hydrogenase.

References

 
 
 

EC 1.12.98
Enzymes of unknown structure